The Sissy Duckling is a children's picture book written by actor Harvey Fierstein and illustrated by Henry Cole.  It is 40 pages long and intended for children ages 5–8.

It follows the story of Elmer, a duckling who is mocked for being a "sissy" but who ultimately proves his bravery. It is based off of an HBO children's special aired three years before the book was released, written by and starring Fierstein as the voice of Elmer the Duckling. The special was nominated for the GLAAD Media Award for Outstanding Individual Episode.

Creation 
	
Fierstein was inspired to write the story of The Sissy Duckling after being asked to write an episode for the HBO series Happily Ever After: Fairy Tales for Every Child. They asked him to make a Jewish version of a classic Western fairy-tale, but Fierstein thought that a fairy-tale modified to center a gay character was more needed at the time, choosing Hans Christian Andersen’s The Ugly Duckling to modify and recreate. The Sissy Duckling, however as not made into an episode of Happily Ever After, but instead an entirely separate TV special aired on HBO in 1999. Fierstein was then contacted by Simon & Schuster to turn his original script into a children’s picture book.

Reception

The Kirkus Reviews magazine positively reviewed the book as “heartwarming”, while Publishers Weekly praised Fierstein for handling "serious and silly moments with aplomb".

Statistics-wise, the book has a 4.6 star rating on Amazon and a 3.95 star rating on Goodreads. 

Despite its overall positive public reception, The Sissy Duckling has garnered negative reception due to its LGBTQ+ themes. Specifically, it was challenged by the Montgomery County, Texas Memorial Library System in 2004, along with 15 other children’s books said to have contained “gay-positive” themes. Objections to the book were posted on the Library Patrons of Texas website. The posts referenced and linked other, similar objections posted on the website of the Fairfax County, Virginia-based organization Parents Against Bad Books in Schools.

References

2002 children's books
American picture books
Children's_books_with_LGBT_themes
Fictional ducks